

Buildings and structures

Buildings
 c. 1050
 West Mebon built in Angkor.
 Construction of Église Notre-Dame de l'Assomption, Rouffach, begins.
 Parish church of St Mary the Virgin, Ovingham, Northumberland, England, consecrated.
 1050
 Construction of Basilica of Sant'Abbondio in Como, Lombardy begins.
 Bernay Abbey, Normandy completed.
 1053
 Varadharaja Perumal Temple of Kanchipuram in India (Chola Empire) built.
 Phoenix Hall of the Byōdō-in in Heian-kyō, Japan built.
 1055 – Liaodi Pagoda (料敵塔), Hebei, China is completed
 1056 – Sakyamuni Pagoda of Fogong Temple (佛宫寺释迦塔), Shanxi, China is completed
 1057
 Church of Monastery of San Salvador of Leyre, Navarra consecrated.
 Near Caves (Pechersk Lavra) founded.
 1059
 Abbaye aux Dames, Caen founded.
 Luoyang Bridge in China completed

Births

Deaths

11th-century architecture
Architecture